Yongshun County is a county of Hunan Province, China. It is under the administration of Xiangxi Autonomous Prefecture.

Located on the western part of Hunan and the northeastern Xiangxi, the county is bordered to the northeast by Sangzhi County, to the east by Yongding District of Zhangjiajie City, to the southeast by Yuanling County, to the south by Guzhang County, to the southwest by Baojing County, to the west by Longshan County. The county has 12 towns  and 11 townships under its jurisdiction, the county seat is Lingxi Town.

Settlements
Settlements in Yongshun county include:
 Longjiazhai
 Qingtianping
 Shidixi

Climate

References
www.xzqh.org

External links 

 
County-level divisions of Hunan
Xiangxi Tujia and Miao Autonomous Prefecture